Bùi Thị Như (born 16 June 1990) is a Vietnamese footballer who plays as a defender for Women's Championship club Phong Phú Hà Nam. She has been a member of the Vietnam women's national team.

References

1990 births
Living people
Women's association football defenders
Vietnamese women's footballers
Vietnam women's international footballers
Southeast Asian Games gold medalists for Vietnam
Southeast Asian Games medalists in football
Competitors at the 2017 Southeast Asian Games
Southeast Asian Games silver medalists for Vietnam
Competitors at the 2013 Southeast Asian Games
Footballers at the 2010 Asian Games
Footballers at the 2014 Asian Games
Asian Games competitors for Vietnam
21st-century Vietnamese women